The FIS Ski Flying World Ski Championships 1990 took place on 25 February 1990 in Vikersund, Norway for the second time. Vikersund hosted the championships previously in 1977. The two best of three jumps counted. After a failed first round with 134 metres, Dieter Thoma won the title by producing a joint hill record 171 metres jump in the second and 165 metres in the third.

Individual
25 February 1990

Medal table

References
 FIS Ski flying World Championships 1990 results. - accessed 28 November 2009.

FIS Ski Flying World Championships
1990 in ski jumping
1990 in Norwegian sport
Ski jumping competitions in Norway
Modum
February 1990 sports events in Europe